Jin Yujia (born 6 February 1997) is a Singaporean badminton player.

Early life 
Born in Hangzhou, Jin arrived in Singapore in early 2008 when she was 10 not intending to become an athlete, but rather as a student. She attended Yu Neng Primary School at Bedok and completed her O Levels examinations at Anglican High School at Tanah Merah.

However, as her mother Yang Nianhong was an ex-Chinese national player in badminton, she was used to playing with the sport recreationally. Eventually, she played well enough to join the Singapore national team on her own merit to play full-time.

Career 
Jin won her first senior international title at the 2017 India International Series tournament in Hyderabad, India. At the 2018 Mongolia International, she won double titles in the mixed and women's doubles event.

2022 Commonwealth Games
At the 2022 Commonwealth Games, Jin won the bronze medal as Singapore finished bronze medalists at the mixed team event after defeating England 3–0.

Achievements

BWF International Challenge/Series (5 titles, 3 runners-up) 
Women's doubles

Mixed doubles

  BWF International Challenge tournament
  BWF International Series tournament

References

External links 
 

Living people
1997 births
Sportspeople from Hangzhou
Badminton players from Zhejiang
Singaporean people of Chinese descent
Singaporean female badminton players
Badminton players at the 2022 Commonwealth Games
Commonwealth Games bronze medallists for Singapore
Commonwealth Games medallists in badminton
Competitors at the 2019 Southeast Asian Games
Competitors at the 2021 Southeast Asian Games
Southeast Asian Games bronze medalists for Singapore
Southeast Asian Games medalists in badminton
21st-century Singaporean women
Medallists at the 2022 Commonwealth Games